Couta Rocks is a rural locality in the local government area (LGA) of Circular Head in the North-west and west LGA region of Tasmania. The 2016 census recorded a population of 7 for the state suburb of Couta Rocks.

History 
Couta Rocks is a confirmed locality.

Geography
The waters of the Southern Ocean form the western boundary. Rebecca Creek forms much of the southern boundary.

Road infrastructure 
Route C214 (Rebecca Road / Temma Road) runs through from east to north-west.

References

Towns in Tasmania
Localities of Circular Head Council